Ralph Ferron (born 13 May 1972) is a Luxembourg international footballer with 26 caps.

References

Luxembourg international footballers
1972 births
Association football defenders
Living people
Place of birth missing (living people)
Luxembourgian footballers
FC Avenir Beggen players
FC Etzella Ettelbruck players
20th-century Luxembourgian people